The Wilgartaburg, also called the Wiligartaburg, Wilgartsburg or Wiligartisburg, is the heritage site of a ruined rock castle located at a height of  near the German village of Wilgartswiesen in the state of Rhineland-Palatinate.

Location 
The remains of the former hill castle are located near Wilgartswiesen before the Rinnthal at around 245 metres above sea level on a spur of the Göckelberg hill above the  River Queich. This left tributary of the Rhine rises in the Wasgau region which comprises the southern part of the Palatinate Forest in Germany and the northern part of the Vosges in France.

History 
The Wilgartaburg is one of the oldest castles in the Palatinate region, probably dating to the 8th or 9th century. According to an unverified source it was built in the late 10th or early 11th century by an abbot of Hornbach Abbey, initially as a wooden castle. In the Salian era (11th century) it was rebuilt in stone. This was expanded in the 12th century and a final remodelling took place in the 13th century. The castle was probably abandoned at the end of the 13th century in favour of the better situated Falkenburg Castle.

According to legend, after the death of her husband, Gaugrave Wernher I, his widow, Wiligarta, led a hermit's life here as penance to atone for his dissolute life. On 16 April 828, her granddaughter, also called Wiligarta and the daughter of Wernher II, donated her estate, Wiligartawisa, with all the fields, pastureland and woods within which the castle stood, to Hornbach Abbey.

Layout 
All that survives of the castle are a few wall remains, numerous putlog holes and rock chambers.

Literature 
 Helmut Bernhard, Dieter Barz: Frühe Burgen in der Pfalz. Ausgewählte Beispiele salischer Wehranlagen. In: Horst Wolfgang Böhme: Burgen der Salierzeit in Hessen, in Rheinland-Pfalz und im Saarland. In: ders. (ed.): Burgen der Salierzeit, Teil 2: In den südlichen Landschaften des Reiches. Römisch-Germanische Zentralmuseum Monographien 26. Verlag Thorbecke. Sigmaringen, 1991. pp. 125–175
 
 Arndt Hartung: Pfälzer Burgenrevier. p. 78, Ludwigshafen, 1985
 Walter Ehescheid: Pfälzisches Burgen-Lexikon IV.2 St-Z. pp. 334–240, Kaiserslautern, 2007
 Walter Eitelmann: Rittersteine im Pfälzerwald. p. 50, Neustadt, 1998
 Friedrich-Wilhelm Krahe: Burgen des Deutschen Mittelalters. p. 670, Augsburg, 1996

External links 
 Wilgartaburg at hinterweidenthal.de
 Photos of the Wilgartaburg at Burgenparadies.de
 Artist's impression of the castle in medieval times

Ruined castles in Germany
Castles in Rhineland-Palatinate
Buildings and structures in the Palatinate Forest
South Palatinate
Buildings and structures in Südwestpfalz